The Goodyear Classic was a golf tournament on the South African Tour from the 1984 to 1992. It was generally held in December but in the 1989/1990 season it was held in February. The event was held at Humewood Golf Club in Port Elizabeth, South Africa.

Winners 
1984  John Bland
1985  Denis Watson
1986  Tony Johnstone
1987  John Bland
1988  Trevor Dodds
1990 (Feb)  Philip Jonas
1990 (Dec)  Fulton Allem
1991  Justin Hobday
1992  Ernie Els

References 

Golf tournaments in South Africa